Tama Janowitz (born April 12, 1956) is an American novelist and a short story writer. She is often referenced as one of the main "brat pack" authors, along with Bret Easton Ellis and Jay McInerney.

Life
Her parents, psychiatrist Julian Janowitz, and Phyllis Janowitz (née Winer), a literature professor at Cornell University, divorced when she was ten. She and her brother David grew up with her mother in Massachusetts, and, for two years in the late 1960s, in Israel.

Janowitz graduated from Barnard College with a B.A. in 1977 and from Hollins College with an M.A. in 1979. In 1985 she received an M.F.A from the Columbia University School of the Arts.

Upon settling in New York City, Janowitz started writing about life there, socializing with Andy Warhol, and becoming well known in Manhattan literary and social circles. Her 1986 collection of short stories, Slaves of New York, brought her wider fame. Publishers Weekly described the book as seven stories featuring a woman named Eleanor, "a diffident young woman who gains entree to the arty milieu of lower Manhattan, which seems to combine elements of Oz and Never-Never-Land with Dante's Inferno." Slaves of New York was adapted into a 1989 film directed by James Ivory and starring Bernadette Peters. Janowitz wrote the screenplay and also appeared, playing Peters' friend.

Janowitz has published seven novels, one collection of stories and one work of nonfiction. She left Manhattan to live in Brooklyn with her British husband and art-gallery owner, Tim Hunt, and their daughter.  She now lives near Ithaca, New York.

Her memoir, Scream: A Memoir of Glamour and Dysfunction, was published in August 2016 to reviews both positive and negative.  In The New York Times Book Review, Ada Calhoun noted Janowitz's deadpan, almost careless way of looking at her own life and the glamor of hanging out with Andy Warhol and dancing at Studio 54. The review also addressed the concern with material goods and financial security that drives many of Janowitz's novels and led her to appear in ads for Amaretto and other products. Calhoun wrote, "This memoir—which spans her childhood (partly spent in 1968 Israel, where her family was booted from a hotel for not paying), her adventuresome youth (she had a fling with a 63-year-old Lawrence Durrell when she was 19), her career struggles and successes, and her more recent life as caretaker to her dying mother — shows that she comes by her obsession with money honestly."

Awards
 1975 Bread Loaf Writers fellowship
 1976; 1977 Janoway Fiction prize
 1982 National Endowment award

Publications

Fiction
American Dad, Crown, 1981, ; Picador, 1988, 
Slaves of New York, Crown Publishers, 1986, 
Five, (with Constance DeJong, Richard Prince, Joe Gibbons, and Leslie Thornton), New York: Top Stories, 1986, 
A Cannibal in Manhattan, Washington Square Press, July 1988, 
The Male Cross-Dresser Support Group, Crown Publishers, 1992, ; Simon and Schuster, 1994, 
By the Shores of Gitchee Gumee Crown Publishers, 1996, 
A Certain Age, Doubleday, 1999; Anchor Books, 2000, 
Hear that?, Illustrator Tracy Dockray, SeaStar Books, 2001, 
Peyton Amberg, Bloomsbury, 2003, ; Macmillan, 2004, 
They Is Us, The Friday Project Limited, 2008,

Nonfiction

Area Code 212, Bloomsbury, 2002, ; Macmillan, 2005, 
Scream: A Memoir of Glamour and Dysfunction; Dey Street Books, August 9, 2016

References

External links
"My Lunch with Tama", Random House Bold Type, 08 1999, Laura L. Buchwald
"She'll Take Manhattan", New York Magazine, July 14, 1986
Audio Interview with Tama Janowitz
"My Little Pony: A Memoir by Tama Janowitz

1957 births
Living people
Writers from San Francisco
20th-century American novelists
Barnard College alumni
Columbia University School of the Arts alumni
21st-century American novelists
American women novelists
20th-century American women writers
21st-century American women writers